The 1995 Cincinnati Open, known by the corporate title of the Thriftway ATP Championships was a men's tennis tournament played on outdoor hard courts that was part of the Championship Series of the 1995 ATP Tour. It took place in Mason, Ohio, United States, from August 7 through August 14, 1995. First-seeded Andre Agassi won the singles title.

Finals

Singles

 Andre Agassi defeated  Michael Chang 7–5, 6–2
It was Andre Agassi's 6th title of the year and his 30th overall. It was his 3rd Masters title of the year and his 7th overall.

Doubles

 Todd Woodbridge /  Mark Woodforde defeated  Mark Knowles /  Daniel Nestor 6–2, 3–0 ret.

References

External links
 
 Association of Tennis Professionals (ATP) tournament profile

 
Cincinnati Masters
Cincinnati Masters
Thriftway ATP Championships
Cincin